The Dennys River is a river in Washington County, Maine.

The Dennys River was named for an Indian hunter.

See also
List of rivers of Maine

References

Maine Streamflow Data from the USGS
Maine Watershed Data From Environmental Protection Agency

Rivers of Washington County, Maine